Kairat Kudaybergenovich Abdrakhmanov (Kairat Kudaibergenovich Abdrahmanov, born April 21, 1964) was the foreign minister for the Republic of Kazakhstan since December 28, 2016 until December 26, 2018. Abdrakhmanov previously served as Kazakhstan's permanent representative to the United Nations. Abdrakhmanov also served as Kazakhstan's representative to the Organisation for Security and Co-operation in Europe (OSCE)

See also
List of foreign ministers in 2017
List of current foreign ministers

References

1964 births
Living people
Foreign ministers of Kazakhstan
Kazakhstani Sunni Muslims
Al-Farabi Kazakh National University alumni